The 1970 UC Davis Aggies football team represented the University of California, Davis as a member of the Far Western Conference (FWC) during the 1970 NCAA College Division football season. Led by first-year head coach Jim Sochor, UC Davis compiled an overall record of 6–4 with a mark of 2–2 in conference play, tying for third place in the FWC. The team outscored its opponents 208 to 176 For the season. The Aggies played home games at Toomey Field in Davis, California.

Schedule

References

UC Davis
UC Davis Aggies football seasons
UC Davis Aggies football